The world's principal religions and spiritual traditions may be classified into a small number of major groups, though this is not a uniform practice. This theory began in the 18th century with the goal of recognizing the relative levels of civility in different societies, but this practice has since fallen into disrepute in many contemporary cultures.

History of religious categories

Christian categorizations
Initially, Christians had a simple dichotomy of world beliefs: Christian civility versus foreign heresy or barbarity. In the 18th century, "heresy" was clarified to mean Judaism and Islam; along with paganism, this created a fourfold classification which spawned such works as John Toland's Nazarenus, or Jewish, Gentile, and Mahometan Christianity, which represented the three Abrahamic religions as different "nations" or sects within religion itself, the "true monotheism."

Daniel Defoe described the original definition as follows: "Religion is properly the Worship given to God, but 'tis also applied to the Worship of Idols and false Deities." At the turn of the 19th century, in between 1780 and 1810, the language dramatically changed: instead of "religion" being synonymous with spirituality, authors began using the plural, "religions," to refer to both Christianity and other forms of worship. Therefore, Hannah Adams's early encyclopedia, for example, had its name changed from An Alphabetical Compendium of the Various Sects... to A Dictionary of All Religions and Religious Denominations.

In 1838, the four-way division of Christianity, Judaism, Mahommedanism (archaic terminology for Islam) and paganism was multiplied considerably by Josiah Conder's Analytical and Comparative View of All Religions Now Extant among Mankind. Conder's work still adhered to the four-way classification, but in his eye for detail he puts together much historical work to create something resembling the modern Western image: he includes Druze, Yazidis, Mandaeans, and Elamites under a list of possibly monotheistic groups, and under the final category, of "polytheism and pantheism," he listed Zoroastrianism, "Vedas, Puranas, Tantras, Reformed sects" of India as well as "Brahminical idolatry," Buddhism, Jainism, Sikhism, Lamaism, "religion of China and Japan," and "illiterate superstitions" as others.

The modern meaning of the phrase "world religion," putting non-Christians at the same level as Christians, began with the 1893 Parliament of the World's Religions in Chicago. The Parliament spurred the creation of a dozen privately funded lectures with the intent of informing people of the diversity of religious experience: these lectures funded researchers such as William James, D. T. Suzuki, and Alan Watts, who greatly influenced the public conception of world religions.

In the latter half of the 20th century, the category of "world religion" fell into serious question, especially for drawing parallels between vastly different cultures, and thereby creating an arbitrary separation between the religious and the secular.

Islam categorizations
In Islam, the Quran mentions three different categories: Muslims, the People of the Book, and idol worshipers.

Classification

Religious traditions fall into super-groups in comparative religion, arranged by historical origin and mutual influence. Abrahamic religions originate in West Asia, Indian religions in the Indian subcontinent (South Asia) and East Asian religions in East Asia. Another group with supra-regional influence are Afro-American religion, which have their origins in Central and West Africa.

 Middle Eastern religions:
 Abrahamic religions are the largest group, and these consist mainly of Judaism, Christianity, Islam, and the Baháʼí Faith. They are named for the patriarch Abraham, and are unified by the practice of monotheism. Today, at least 3.8 billion people are followers of Abrahamic religions and are spread widely around the world apart from the regions around East and Southeast Asia. Several Abrahamic organizations are vigorous proselytizers. Abrahamic religions with fewer adherents include the Baháʼí Faith, the Druze faith, Samaritanism, and Rastafari. 
 Iranian religions, partly of Indo-European origins, include Zoroastrianism, Yazdânism, Uatsdin, Yarsanism, Manichaeism, and Yazidism.
 Gnosticism, including historical traditions of Mandaeism, which is still alive in the Middle East and diaspora.
 Eastern religions:
 Indian religions, originated in Greater India and they tend to share a number of key concepts, such as dharma, karma, reincarnation among others. They are of the most influence across the Indian subcontinent, East Asia, Southeast Asia, as well as isolated parts of Russia. The main Indian religions are Hinduism, Jainism, Buddhism and Sikhism. 
 East Asian religions consist of several East Asian religions which make use of the concept of Tao (in Chinese), Đạo (in Vietnamese) or Dō (in Japanese or Korean). They include many Chinese folk religions, Taoism and Confucianism, as well as Vietnamese, Korean and Japanese religions, which are influenced by Chinese religious thought.
 Indigenous ethnic religions, found on every continent, now marginalized by the major organized faiths in many parts of the world or persisting as undercurrents (folk religions) of major religions. Includes traditional African religions, Asian shamanism, Native American religions, Austronesian and Australian Aboriginal traditions, Chinese folk religions, and postwar Shinto. Under more traditional listings, this has been referred to as "paganism" along with historical polytheism.
 African religions:
 The religions of the tribal peoples of Sub-Saharan Africa, but excluding ancient Egyptian religion, which is considered to belong to the ancient Middle East; 
 African diasporic religions practiced in the Americas, imported as a result of the Atlantic slave trade of the 16th to 18th centuries, building on traditional religions of Central and West Africa.
 New religious movement is the term applied to any religious faith which has emerged since the 19th century, often syncretizing, re-interpreting or reviving aspects of older traditions such as Ayyavazhi, Mormonism, Ahmadiyya, Pentecostalism, polytheistic reconstructionism, and so forth.

Religious demographics

One way to define a major religion is by the number of current adherents. The population numbers by religion are computed by a combination of census reports and population surveys (in countries where religion data is not collected in census, for example the United States or France), but results can vary widely depending on the way questions are phrased, the definitions of religion used and the bias of the agencies or organizations conducting the survey. Informal or unorganized religions are especially difficult to count.

There is no consensus among researchers as to the best methodology for determining the religiosity profile of the world's population. A number of fundamental aspects are unresolved:

 Whether to count "historically predominant religious culture[s]"
 Whether to count only those who actively "practice" a particular religion
 Whether to count based on a concept of "adherence"
 Whether to count only those who expressly self-identify with a particular denomination
 Whether to count only adults, or to include children as well.
 Whether to rely only on official government-provided statistics
 Whether to use multiple sources and ranges or single "best source(s)"

Largest religious groups

Medium-sized religions

By region

Religions by country according to The World Factbook – CIA
Religion by region
Religion in Africa
Religion in Antarctica
Religion in Asia
Religion in the Middle East
Muslim world (SW Asia and N Africa)
Religion in Europe
Religion in the European Union
Christian world
Religion in North America
Religion in Oceania
Religion in South America

Trends in adherence

Maps of self-reported adherence

See also

 Irreligion
 List of religions and spiritual traditions
 List of religious populations
 World religions
 Numinous
 Religious conversion
 State religion

Notes

References

Sources

External links
 Animated history of World Religions—from the "Religion & Ethics" part of the BBC website, interactive animated view of the spread of world religions (requires Flash plug-in).
 BBC A-Z of Religions and Beliefs
 Major World Religions
 International Council for Inter-Religious Cooperation

Religion-related lists
Religious demographics

eo:Religio#Listo de religioj laŭ grandeco